The European Society of Endocrinology (ESE) is a scientific society to promote for the public benefit research, education and clinical practice in endocrinology by the organisation of conferences, training courses and publications, by raising public awareness, liaison with national and international legislators.

Major activities
Major activities include the organisation of the annual European Congress of Endocrinology. ESE also organises postgraduate courses at least biannually. ESE publishes five official journals: European Journal of Endocrinology, Endocrine Connections, Journal of Endocrinology, Journal of Molecular Endocrinology and Endocrine-Related Cancer.

Governing body
The overall governing body of ESE is the General Council, which comprises all ordinary members, affiliated societies and corporate members. The voting members of the General Council are electing the Executive Committee which shall manage the business of the Society and may exercise all the powers of the Society.

Membership
Ordinary membership is open to researchers, clinicians and students in the field of endocrinology and hormonal systems. Affiliated societies membership is open to national endocrine societies and sub-specialist endocrine societies in Europe. Corporate membership is open to companies working in the field of endocrinology.  Honorary membership is for persons of special distinction in endocrinology or who have performed outstanding service to the Society.

History
An early predecessor organisation of the ESE was the Committee of the Acta Endocrinologica Countries (CAEC), which founded Acta Endocrinologica (Copenhagen), later renamed European Journal of Endocrinology, in June 1948. It also organised the Acta Endocrinologica Congresses, the first of which took place in Copenhagen, Denmark, on 22–25 August 1954. This series of congresses gave way to the first European Congress of Endocrinology in 1987, when the European Federation of Endocrine Societies (EFES), an umbrella organisation of national societies for endocrinology in Europe, was founded. On this basis, the ESE was officially launched on January 1, 2006, following a consultation process with EFES member organisations.

Affiliated societies
Affiliated Society membership is open to national endocrine societies and pan-European sub-specialist endocrine societies in Europe.

Pan-European sub-specialist endocrine societies
 European Academy of Andrology
 European Biological Rhythms Society
 European Calcified Tissue Society
 European Network for the Study of Adrenal Tumors
 European Neuroendocrine Association
 European Neuroendocrine Tumour Society
 European Society for Paediatric Endocrinology
 European Society of Gynecology
 European Thyroid Association

National endocrine societies
 Association of Endocrinologists of the Ukraine
 Associazione Medici Endocrinologi (Italy)
 Austrian Society for Endocrinology and Metabolism
 Belarusian Association of Endocrinologists
 Belgian Endocrine Society
 Bulgarian Society of Endocrinology
 Croatian Society for Endocrinology
 Cyprus Endocrine Society
 Czech Endocrine Society
 Danish Endocrine Society
 Egyptian Association of Endocrinology, Diabetes and Atherosclerosis
 Estonian Endocrine Society
 Finnish Endocrine Society
 French Endocrine Society
 Georgian Endocrinologists Society
 German Society of Endocrinology
 Hellenic Endocrine Society (Greece)
 Hungarian Society of Endocrinology and Metabolism
 Icelandic Endocrine Society
 Irish Endocrine Society
 Israel Endocrine Society
 Italian Endocrine Society
 Latvian Association of Endocrinologists
 Libyan Association for Diabetes and Endocrinology
 Lithuanian Society for Endocrinology
 Macedonian Endocrine Association
 Montenegro, The Endocrinology Association of
 Netherlands Society for Endocrinology (NVE)
 Norwegian Society of Endocrinology
 Polish Society of Endocrinology
 Portuguese Society of Endocrinology
 Romanian Psychoneuroendocrine Society
 Romanian Society of Endocrinology
 Russian Association of Endocrinologists
 Serbian Endocrine Society
 Slovak Endocrine Society
 Slovenian Endocrine Society
 Turkey Society of Endocrinology and Metabolism
 Spanish Society of Endocrinology and Nutrition
 Swedish Endocrine Society
 Swiss Society of Endocrinology & Diabetes
 Tunisian Society of Endocrinology and Metabolism
 Society for Endocrinology

See also
 American Society for Bone and Mineral Research
 Australian and New Zealand Bone and Mineral Society

References

External links
 

Endocrinology organizations
International medical associations of Europe